KFRE may refer to:

 KFRE-TV, a television station (channel 59 analog/36 digital) licensed to serve Sanger, California, United States
 KFRE-CA, a defunct low-power television station (channel 27) formerly licensed to serve Tulare, California
 KYNO 940 AM, a radio station licensed to Fresno, California, United States, which held the call sign KFRE from 1937 to 2000
 KSKS 93.7 FM, a radio station licensed to Fresno, California, United States, which held the call sign KFRE-FM from 1963 to 1971